1977 Egypt Cup Final, was the final match of 1976–77 Egypt Cup, when Zamalek played Ismaily, Zamalek won the game 3–1.

Route to the final

Game description

Match details

References

1977
EC 1977
EC 1977